Isaías Ignacio Peralta Clavería (born 21 August 1987) is a Chilean footballer who last played for Coquimbo Unido in the Primera B de Chile.

International career
Peralta represented Chile at the 2007 FIFA U-20 World Cup, playing only one match. In the semi-finals against Argentina, he was almost tasered to death and lost consciousness for over 20 minutes after Chilean players clashed with police officers. He was also verbally and physically abused by the police, leading to allegations of racism and police brutality from Chilean fans.

Honours

Club
Coquimbo Unido
 Primera B (1): 2021

International
Chile
 FIFA U-20 World Cup: Third place 2007

References

External links
 
 

1987 births
Living people
Footballers from Santiago
Chilean footballers
Chile under-20 international footballers
Chilean Primera División players
Segunda División Profesional de Chile players
Primera B de Chile players
Unión Española footballers
Deportes Iquique footballers
Trasandino footballers
Unión San Felipe footballers
Deportes Temuco footballers
San Marcos de Arica footballers
San Antonio Unido footballers
Deportes Iberia footballers
Deportes Santa Cruz footballers
Deportes Valdivia footballers
Coquimbo Unido footballers
Association football midfielders